Zhong Minwei (born 9 April 1987) is a Chinese triple jumper. His personal best jump is 17.27 metres, achieved in June 2007 in Jinan.

He won the bronze medal at the 2006 World Junior Championships and finished eleventh at the 2007 World Championships. He also competed at the 2008 World Indoor Championships without reaching the final.

Achievements

References

1987 births
Living people
Chinese male triple jumpers
Athletes (track and field) at the 2008 Summer Olympics
Olympic athletes of China